Government Medical College, Kozhikode, also known as Calicut Medical College (CMC), is a school of medicine in Kozhikode (formerly Calicut) in the Indian state of Kerala. The college was established in 1957 as the second medical college in Kerala. With over 3025 beds, it is currently the largest hospital in India. Formerly affiliated to the University of Calicut, the college is now attached to the Kerala University for Health Sciences (KUHS). Calicut Medical College is the most preferred medical college of Kerala during both All India as well as state counsellings for M.B.B.S. admission.Calicut Medical College is one of the largest medical college in India with an area covering more than 270 acres of land in the outskirts of Calicut City

Publication
It publishes the Calicut Medical Journal. The Institute of Palliative Medicine of Kozhikode is part of it.

Institutes

Institute of Maternal and Child Health 
The Institute of Maternal and Child Health (IMCH) is a 1100 bed tertiary care center dedicated to maternal and child health care. The Institute of Maternal and Child Health of Medical College is a regional diagnostic centre for Primary Immunodeficiency Disorders. This collaborative centre provides clinical care as well as genetic diagnosis for patients with Primary immunodeficiency disorders. This collaborative centre is part of the Genomics for Understanding Rare Diseases India Alliance Network (GUaRDIAN) Initiative.

Institute of Palliative Medicine 
Institute of Palliative Medicine (IPM) is a WHO collaborative centre for Community participation in Palliative Care and Long term Care

Institute of Mental Health and Neurosciences 
The Institute of Mental Health and Neurosciences (IMHANS) is an autonomous institute under the government of Kerala.

Government Women and Children hospital, Kozhikode 
This was established in 1903 by Raja Sir Savalai Ramaswamy Mudaliar and was handed over to the Government on 22 September 1903

Notable alumni 
Azad Moopen, physician, Padma Shri (2011) 
K. C. Joseph, politician
Khadija Mumtaz, author
M. K. Muneer, former minister (only for house surgency. MBBS course was done in a private college in Bangalore)
P. K. Sasidharan, Doctor, Author, Social activist, Educator
 Vinod Scaria, Indian Biologist, Medical Researcher
 Jame Abraham, physician, author

See also
 History of Medical Education in Calicut
 Kovoor Town
 Kuttikkattoor
 Devagiri
 Chevayur

References

Medical colleges in Kerala
Universities and colleges in Kozhikode
Kozhikode
Educational institutions established in 1957
1957 establishments in Kerala
Hospitals in Kozhikode